Hopewell is a former community in Pike County, Arkansas, United States.

The site was on county road just east of Wolf Creek approximately three miles northwest of Delight and 7.5 miles east of Murfreesboro.

References

Geography of Pike County, Arkansas
Ghost towns in Arkansas